Paper Boats is a 1963 Argentine and Spanish drama film directed by Román Viñoly Barreto and starring Pablo Calvo.

Cast
Pablo Calvo
Jardel Filho
Ubaldo Martínez
Enzo Viena
Mariángeles
Alita Román
Ariel Absalón
Alberto Olmedo
Oscar Orlegui

References

External links
 

1963 films
1960s Spanish-language films
Argentine black-and-white films
Spanish black-and-white films
Films directed by Román Viñoly Barreto
Argentine drama films
1963 drama films
1960s Argentine films